The 2005 IBF World Championships (14th World Badminton Championships) was held in Anaheim, southern California, United States, from August 15 to August 21, 2005.

2004 Olympic champion Taufik Hidayat of Indonesia won the men's singles over China's Lin Dan, while Peter Gade of Denmark and Lee Chong Wei of Malaysia received bronze medals.

In the women's singles category, Xie Xingfang won the gold medal beating compatriot 2004 Olympic gold medalist Zhang Ning. Germany's Xu Huaiwen and Chinese Taipei's Cheng Shao-chieh won bronze medals. Cheng Shao-chieh also created some surprise results in the tournament.

Women's doubles was almost an all-China show. 2004 Olympic gold medalists Yang Wei/Zhang Jiewen repeated their 2004 Olympic performance with victory over silver medalists Gao Ling/Huang Sui.

In the mixed doubles, number 1 seeds Nathan Robertson/Gail Emms of England backed out before commencement of the tournament due to an injury to Robertson.  This paved the way for several pairs to contest the medals.  Indonesia's Nova Widianto and Liliyana Natsir secured the gold over China's up and coming Xie Zhongbo/Zhang Yawen. Zhang Yawen also become the only double medalist in this games winning the silver in mixed doubles and bronze in the women's doubles.

The biggest surprise in the tournament came in men's doubles. Though former Indonesian star Tony Gunawan had long been recognized as one of the premier men's doubles players in the game, he and his American partner Howard Bach were only the 13th seeded team in the competition. However, from the round of 16 through the semifinal they routinely defeated higher seeded pairs to reach the final. There, before a surprisingly large "hometown crowd",  they overcame the second seeded Indonesian team of Sigit Budiarto and Candra Wijaya in three close games to become the first American winners of any event since the IBF first held an official World Championships in 1977.

Host city selection
Anaheim (United States) and Aarhus (Denmark) were the candidates for the host of the championships. Singapore withdrew its bid before the council meeting which later awarded the event to Anaheim.

Venue
The championships was held at Arrowhead Pond.

Medalists
China had an excellent tournament, winning seven medals in total, including the gold medals in the women's singles and women's doubles, as well as four of the five silvers. Indonesia won both the men's singles and mixed doubles. The men's doubles tournament was won by the 13th seeds, Tony Gunawan and Howard Bach, winning the United States's first ever gold at the World Championships.

Medal table

Events

Participating nations
A total of 50 nations entered players at the 2005 IBF World Championships. The number of competitors is indicated in parentheses.

 [3]
 [3]
 [3]
 [14]
 [21]
 [4]
 [4]
 [16]
 [18]
 [3]
 [3]
 [10]
 [8]
 [2]
 [8]
 [2]
 [4]
 [10]
 [3]
 [4]
 [1]
 [2]
 [20]
 [1]
 [21]
 [7]
 [11]
 [2]
 [1]
 [4]
 [5]
 [2]
 [5]
 [4]
 [9]
 [10]
 [8]
 [3]
 [11]
 [6]
 [1]
 [2]
 [7]
 [4]
 [10]
 [2]
 [3]
 [15]
 [1]
 [2]

References

External links

2005 IBF World Championships Full Results

 
World Championships
2005 in American sports
BWF World Championships
Badminton tournaments in the United States
International sports competitions hosted by the United States
International sports competitions in California